BR Standard Class 4 2-6-0 76084 is a BR Standard Class 4 2-6-0 locomotive built at Horwich in March 1957. Owned by The 76084 Locomotive Company Limited it is one of only four surviving members of its class in preservation.

British Railways service
76084 was outshopped from Horwich Works on 28 March 1957.

Designed with a light axle-loading of only 16 tons, this meant that the BR Standard 4's route availability of RA4 was unrestricted and was able to work on all regions throughout Great Britain. Batches of the class were allocated to every region except the Western. Like most of the class, the BR2A tender was fitted. This had a narrower upper bunker, giving better visibility when running tender-first. Class members allocated to the Southern region had the more capacious full-width BR1B tender, as the extra tank capacity was needed with the absence of water troughs on the Southern.

From new 76084 was allocated to Lower Darwen in March 1957 alongside siblings 76080/1/2 and 3, further transfers were to follow during its career to Lancaster Green Ayre, Skipton and even Springs Branch.

76084 and its four siblings were transferred to Sutton Oak, St. Helens in March 1965 when Lower Darwen closed. All but 76082 were transferred to Springs Branch, Wigan in June 1967 when Sutton Oak too closed. Springs Branch was its final shed allocation where it remained until December 1967 when it was withdrawn from service. 76084 was taken to Barry Island in convoy with 76077 and 76079. The latter locomotive has been returned to service and is now at the North Yorkshire Moors Railway but 76077 is now undergoing restoration by Toddington Standard Locomotive Ltd for the Gloucestershire Warwickshire Steam Railway.

Preservation
In October 1974 members of a preservation group from Sheffield spent a working weekend at Woodham Brothers scrapyard at Barry Island with a view to purchasing 76084 for preservation. They painted it in red primer to prevent further corrosion as it stood out in the yard. The preservation attempt failed and it remained at Barry Island for a further eight years, until 1982. Over the years, as space was becoming tight, 76084 was moved down the siding right towards the buffers and as time passed it was stripped of various parts as Woodhams became a valuable source of steam locomotive spares. In 1982 it was purchased by a preservationist for £7,500, and in January 1983 76084 left Woodhams for a new life in South Leverton near Retford, Nottinghamshire. It had spent fourteen years and four months in South Wales, and was the 143rd locomotive to leave the yard.

It was placed in its owner's back garden and was given a cosmetic makeover. In the 1990s its owner died and its future became uncertain. It was later purchased by what became the 76084 Locomotive Company and was moved to Morpeth where restoration was carried out.

76084 returned to steam in May 2013 and returned to traffic in July 2013 after a sixteen-year restoration programme costing £0.75 million.

Main line safety technologies - TPWS Mark IV, OTMR and GSM-R - were fitted and tested after raising a further £100,000 from shareholders and supporters. The engine worked its first charter train on 25 February 2017, the tour being The Railway Touring Company's "Buxton Spa Express" which it double headed with 45690 Leander.

76084 is based on the North Norfolk Railway.

References

External links 

 

76084
4 76084
Individual locomotives of Great Britain
Standard gauge steam locomotives of Great Britain
Locomotives saved from Woodham Brothers scrapyard
Railway locomotives introduced in 1957